Kenneth Aubrey Farnum (18 January 1931 – 4 April 2020) was a Jamaican cyclist. He competed in the men's sprint and 1,000 metres time trial events at the 1952 Summer Olympics. 

He died on 4 April 2020, in New York City from complications of COVID-19.

References

External links
 

1931 births
2020 deaths
Jamaican male cyclists
Olympic cyclists of Jamaica
Cyclists at the 1952 Summer Olympics
Deaths from the COVID-19 pandemic in New York (state)